Cycas furfuracea is a species of cycad, endemic to northeastern Western Australia.

Range
In Australia, Cycas furfuracea is found in:

Bold Bluff, Mount Broome
Mount Herbert in the Wunaamin-Miliwundi Ranges
Kimbolton area

References

furfuracea
Endemic flora of Western Australia